A Warm and Dark Embrace is Damien Deadson's first studio album, which was released on January 29, 2012. The album was recorded entirely by Ryan Helm in his home studio (Helms Deep) in Winston-Salem, North Carolina throughout 2010 and 2011. A Warm and Dark Embrace was mastered by Jamie King of The Basement Studio in Winston-Salem, North Carolina.

Track List

Credits
Written by Ryan Helm
Recorded by Ryan Helm
Produced by Ryan Helm
Mixed by Ryan Helm
Mastered by Jamie King
Artwork by Justin Reich

References

2012 albums